Harry Christian Peter Blain  (born 12 September 1967) is a British art dealer and a co-founder of the BlainSouthern gallery.

In 2002 he started Haunch of Venison gallery with Graham Southern.

Together with Southern, Blain staged exhibitions at Haunch of Venison, including surveys of Abstract Expressionism and late twentieth century Russian art in New York and London respectively.

In 2007 Blain and Southern sold Haunch of Venison to Christie's International plc. However, they remained within the business and continued to run the gallery until they both departed to launch a new gallery, BlainSouthern, in 2010.

In October 2010 Blain and Emmanuel Di Donna launched Blain DiDonna in the former premises of Ursus Books in the Carlyle Hotel on Madison Avenue, New York.

Citations 

Living people
British art dealers
1967 births